Gannavaram railway station (station code:GWM) is an Indian Railways station in Gannavaram of Andhra Pradesh. It lies on the Duvvada–Vijayawada section of Howrah–Chennai main line and is administered under Vijayawada railway division of South Coast Railway zone. It serves one of the satellite stations of Vijayawada railway station. It is one of the 27 rural stations in the state to have Wi-Fi.

Classification 
In terms of earnings and outward passengers handled, Gannavaram is categorized as a Non-Suburban Grade-6 (NSG-6) railway station. Based on the re–categorization of Indian Railway stations for the period of 2017–18 and 2022–23, an NSG–6 category station earns nearly  crore and handles close to  passengers.

References 

Railway stations in Krishna district
Vijayawada railway division